Alessandro Rinaldi might refer to:

Alessandro Rinaldi (painter) (born 1839), Cremonese historic painter
Alessandro Rinaldi (footballer) (born 1974), Italian footballer

See also
 Rinaldi, surname